Ahmad Milad Karimi (born February 10, 1979) is an Afghan-born German philosopher of religion, scholar of Islam, translator of the Koran, and poet. Karimi is professor of Islamic Philosophy at the University of Münster.

Early life
Ahmad Milad Karimi was born in Kabul, Afghanistan in 1979. He and his family fled the Afghan civil war when he was 13.

Career
From 2001 to 2011 Karimi was a Fellow of the German National Academic Foundation as an undergraduate and Doctoral candidate.  Karimi studied philosophy and Islamic studies from 2000 to 2006 at the Albert Ludwig University in Freiburg and at Delhi University in India. In 2012, Karimi was promoted to D.Phil with a thesis on the work of Georg Hegel and Heidegger. In 2009, Karimi produced a new poetical-translation of the Koran Since summer 2016, Karimi has been a regular professor for Kalām, Islamic Philosophy und Mysticism at the University of Münster.

Reception
For his diversity and his "rise from refugee to professor", Karimi is described as "Germany's most dynamic philosophers of religion" (Qantara), "one of the most prominent Islamic scholars in Europe", and one of the "distinctive heads of Islam in Germany". For his work dedication as the "most extraordinary" book of 2015 in the field of Islamic studies in the German-speaking world, Karimi received the Rumi Award for Islamic Studies for his work "Hingabe. Grundfragen der systematisch-islamischen Theologie".

Personal life
Karimi is married and has a son and a daughter.

Bibliography
 Dedication of basic questions of systematic Islamic theology, Grundfragen der systematisch-islamischen Theologie. Rombach, Freiburg 2015. 
 Osama bin Laden sleeps with the fish. Why I like to be Muslim and why Marlon Brando has a lot to do with it., Osama bin Laden schläft bei den Fischen. Warum ich gerne Muslim bin und wieso Marlon Brando damit viel zu tun hat. Herder, Freiburg 2013. 
 Identity - difference - contradiction., Identität - Differenz - Widerspruch. Hegel und Heidegger. Rombach, Freiburg 2012. 
 The Koran. Completely and newly translated by Ahmad Milad Karimi., Der Koran. Vollständig und neu übersetzt von Ahmad Milad Karimi. Hg. von Bernhard Uhde. Herder, Freiburg 2009. 
 Presence of unity. The concept of religion. Written in honor of Bernhard Uhde., Gegenwart der Einheit. Zum Begriff der Religion. Festschrift zu Ehren von Bernhard Uhde. Rombach 2008. 
 Embarrassment, Verlegenheit. Pragun 2006. 
 Poetry with drawings: Hörsturz. Pragun 2006. 
 Be right. Anthology., Stimmen. Anthologie. Literareon 2003.

References

External links

 ]
 Deutschlandfunk: Prägende Köpfe des Islams
 Der Spiegel: „Der liebe Muslim" (Artikel über Ahmad Milad Karimi)
 "Islamische Kinderbücher als Beitrag zur Integration" Interview, Qantara.de, 20. Mai 2011
 "Bücher stiften Frieden" Interview, WDR 5, 30. August 2011 (Artikel wegen 12. Rundfunkänderungsstaatsvertrag vom 1. Juni 2009 nicht mehr abrufbar.)

1979 births
Living people
German Islamic studies scholars
21st-century German philosophers
Afghan emigrants to Germany
University of Freiburg alumni
People from Kabul
Delhi University alumni
University of Münster alumni
Academic staff of the University of Münster